Amphicoelina is a genus of air-breathing land snails, terrestrial pulmonate gastropod mollusks in the subfamily Camaeninae of the family Camaenidae. 

Previously to 2014 this genus was classified under the family Plectopylidae

Distribution
Distribution of the genus Amphicoelina includes Hunan and Hubei provinces in southern China.

Species
Species within the genus Amphicoelina include:
 Amphicoelina biconcava (Heude, 1882) - type species of the genus Amphicoelina
 Amphicoelina diplomphala (Möllendorff, 1885)
 Amphicoelina omphalospira (Möllendorff, 1897)
 Amphicoelina subobvoluta (Ancey, 1882)

References

 Bank, R. A. (2017). Classification of the Recent terrestrial Gastropoda of the World. Last update: July 16th, 2017.

External links

Camaenidae